Nightmusic Volume 2  is a second compilation album by English electronic dance music producer and DJ Steve Helstrip, featuring various trance and electronica artists.

Track listing 
 Disc 1: Plus 365
 The Thrillseekers feat. Aruna – Waiting Here for You (Night Music Edit)
 Lange – Angel Falls (Firewall Remix)
 Misja vs. Jazper – Project: Project
 SNF & Cressida – Talk About It (Hawk Remix)
 Kyau & Albert – Always a Fool (Night Music Edit)
 Breakfast – Sunlight (Original Mix)
 Solar Stone & Alucard – Late Summer Fields (Original Mix)
 Maor Levi – Reflect (Original Mix)
 Marco V – Possible, But Unlikely (Original Mix)
 Joop – The Future (Rank 1 Remix)
 Pulser – Things You Say (Original Mix)
 Forerunners – Lifecycle (Original Mix)
 Robert Gitelman – Memories From the Future (Original Mix)
 Simon Patterson – Strip Search (Original Mix)
 Stephen J Kroos – Innerstamatick Original Mix)

 Disc 2: Minus 365
 Supermodels from Paris – Keep on (Komytea Remix)
 Simon & Shaker – Zero (Original Mix)
 Headstrong – The Truth (David West Remix)
 Delerium feat. Isabel Baydrakdran – Angelicus (Andy Moor Remix)
 Filo & Peri feat. Fisher – Ordinary Moment (Breakfast Mix)
 Terry Ferminal – Nymph (Original Mix)
 Purple Haze – Rush (Original Mix)
 Alex M.O.R.P.H. & Rank 1 – Life Less Ordinary (Original Mix)
 Mind One – Hurt Of Intention (Ferry Corsten Fix)
 Above & Beyond – Good for Me (Club Mix)
 The Thrillseekers – NewLife (Mike Koglin 2007 Remix)
 Markus Schulz & Departure with Gabriel & Dresden – Without You Near (Alex M.O.R.P.H. Remix)
 Sean Tyas – Lift (Original Mix)
 Sander Van Doorn – Punk'd (Sean Tyas Rmx)
 Stoneface & Terminal – Super Nature (Original Mix)

2007 compilation albums